Jack the Ripper was an unidentified serial killer active in and around Whitechapel, London, England, in 1888.

Jack the Ripper may also refer to:

Film and television
Jack the Ripper (1959 film), a British film
Jack the Ripper (1973 TV series), a BBC television drama
Jack the Ripper (1976 film), a Swiss–German thriller film
Jack the Ripper (1988 miniseries), a television mini-series

Literature
Jack the Ripper: The Final Solution, a 1976 book by Stephen Knight
Jack the Ripper, Light-Hearted Friend, a 1996 book by Richard Wallace
Jack the Ripper (Black Clover), a character in Black Clover
Jack the Ripper, a Fate/Apocrypha character

Music
Jack the Ripper (band), a French alternative rock band
Jack the Ripper (musical), a 1974 musical by Ron Pember
Jack the Ripper, a 1963 album by Link Wray

Songs
"Jack the Ripper" (song), a 1961 song by Clarence Stacy covered by Screaming Lord Sutch in 1963
"Jack the Ripper", a 1961 song by Link Wray
"Jack the Ripper", a 1989 song by LL Cool J
"Jack the Ripper", a 2011 song by The Misfits from The Devil's Rain
"Jack the Ripper", a 1992 song by Motörhead from March ör Die
"Jack the Ripper", a 1992 song by Morrissey from the single "Certain People I Know"
"Jack the Ripper", a 1992 song by Nick Cave and the Bad Seeds from Henry's Dream
"Jack the Ripper", a 1986 song by Seikima-II

Video games
Jack the Ripper (1987 video game), a text adventure game by CRL
Jack the Ripper (2003 video game), an adventure game for Microsoft Windows
Raiden (Metal Gear) or Jack the Ripper, a character in the Metal Gear games

Other uses
Casebook: Jack the Ripper, a website started in 1996
The perpetrator of the New York Ripper murders

See also

Black the Ripper (born 1987), British rapper
Whitechapel murders, associated with Jack the Ripper
From Hell letter, associated with Jack the Ripper and the Whitechapel murders

Ripper (disambiguation)
Jack (disambiguation)